Stéphane Veilleux (born November 16, 1981) is a Canadian former professional ice hockey left winger. He most notably played in the National Hockey League (NHL) with the Minnesota Wild, Tampa Bay Lightning and the New Jersey Devils.

Playing career
As a youth, Veilleux played in the 1994 and 1995 Quebec International Pee-Wee Hockey Tournaments with a minor ice hockey team from Beauce, Quebec.

Veilleux was drafted in the third round, 93rd overall by the Minnesota Wild in the 2001 NHL Entry Draft. He went on to play a total of six seasons for the Wild, playing many games alongside star forward Marián Gáborík. After the 2008–09 season, the Wild decided not to renew his contract, and he was released into unrestricted free agency. On July 7, 2009, he signed a one-year contract with the Tampa Bay Lightning. On December 28, 2009, he skated in his 400th career NHL game, playing against the Boston Bruins.

In October 2010, Veilloux signed for Espoo Blues of the Finnish SM-liiga. He left the team in January and signed with Swiss National League A team HC Ambrì-Piotta. On July 29, 2011, he then signed a one-year deal with the New Jersey Devils.

On February 24, 2012, Veilleux was traded, along with Kurtis Foster, Nick Palmieri and the Washington Capitals' second-round pick in 2012, back to the Minnesota Wild in exchange for defenceman Marek Židlický.

Personal life
Veilleux is known as an avid table tennis player in his spare time, and also plays before games as warm-ups.

Career statistics

References

External links

1981 births
Living people
Albany Devils players
Canadian ice hockey left wingers
Espoo Blues players
HC Ambrì-Piotta players
Houston Aeros (1994–2013) players
Ice hockey people from Quebec
Iowa Wild players
Minnesota Wild draft picks
Minnesota Wild players
New Jersey Devils players
Oji Eagles players
People from Saint-Georges, Quebec
Tampa Bay Lightning players
Val-d'Or Foreurs players
Victoriaville Tigres players
Canadian expatriate ice hockey players in Finland
Canadian expatriate ice hockey players in Switzerland